Birger Ruud (23 August 1911 – 13 June 1998) was a Norwegian ski jumper and alpine skier.

Career 

Born in Kongsberg, Birger Ruud, with his brothers Sigmund and Asbjørn, dominated international jumping in the 1930s, winning three world championships in 1931, 1935 and 1937.

Ruud also won the Olympic gold medal in 1932 and 1936, the first repeat winner of ski jumping gold.  He also was an accomplished alpine skier, winning a bronze medal in the combined at the 1935 world championships. Ruud won the Holmenkollen ski jumping competition in 1934 and shared the Holmenkollen medal in 1937 with Olaf Hoffsbakken and Martin P. Vangsli.

In 1943, during the German occupation of Norway, Ruud was incarcerated at Grini concentration camp for expressing his anti-Nazi sentiments. After his release in 1944, he joined the Norwegian resistance movement. He also competed in the 1948 Olympics, winning the ski jumping silver medal at age 36, though he was initially only at the Games as assistant coach of Norway’s ski jumping team. This accomplishment he personally held in the highest regard; it made him the first ski jumper to medal in three different Olympics.

Twice he set ski jumping world records: 76.5 m (250.98 ft) in Odnesbakken in 1931, and 92 m (301.84 ft) in Planica in 1934.

Later in life, Birger Ruud, with his friend Petter Hugsted, the 1948 gold medalist, participated in the creation of the Kongsberg Skiing Museum.

In 1987, a bronze sculpture of Birger Ruud, by the Norwegian sculptor Per Ung, was set up in Ruud’s native town of Kongsberg, and in 1991 he was awarded the Egebergs Ærespris for his achievements in ski jumping and alpine skiing. Ruud was selected to light the Olympic Flame at the 1994 Lillehammer Olympics in Norway, but had to withdraw due to heart complications immediately before the event. He died in 1998, aged 86.

Ski jumping world records

 Not recognized! Crash at world record distance.

References

External links 

 
 Birger Ruud's Memorial Fund
 Birger Ruud Philately
 . Alpine skiing profile
 . Ski jumping profile
  
  
 
 
 Sculpture

1911 births
1998 deaths
Ski jumpers at the 1932 Winter Olympics
Ski jumpers at the 1936 Winter Olympics
Alpine skiers at the 1936 Winter Olympics
Ski jumpers at the 1948 Winter Olympics
Holmenkollen medalists
Holmenkollen Ski Festival winners
Norwegian male alpine skiers
Olympic alpine skiers of Norway
Norwegian male ski jumpers
Olympic ski jumpers of Norway
Olympic gold medalists for Norway
Olympic silver medalists for Norway
Grini concentration camp survivors
Norwegian resistance members
Olympic medalists in ski jumping
FIS Nordic World Ski Championships medalists in ski jumping
Medalists at the 1932 Winter Olympics
Medalists at the 1936 Winter Olympics
Medalists at the 1948 Winter Olympics
Kongsberg IF ski jumpers
People from Kongsberg
Sportspeople from Viken (county)